Iris munzii is a species of iris which is endemic to the Sierra Nevada foothills of Tulare County, California, mostly in the vicinity of the Tule River. It is quite rare in the wild. Its common names include Tulare lavender iris and Munz's iris. Its flowers grow in inflorescences of three to four per stem, and are usually lighter shades of purple and blue with darker veining.

Taxonomy
It was first published and described by Robert Crichton Foster in his book 'Iridis Species Novae' (published in Cambridge, Massachusetts) on page 2 in 1938.

The Latin specific epithet munzii is in honour of the American botanist Philip A. Munz.
 
Iris munzii is a tentatively accepted name by the Royal Horticultural Society in the UK, and was last listed in the RHS Plant Finder in 2000. It was verified by United States Department of Agriculture and the Agricultural Research Service on 4 April 2003.

Distribution and habitat
It is native to the temperate region of Northern America.

Range
It is found in California.

Habitat
It is found growing on dry to moist partially wooded slopes and rarely along stream banks.

References

Other sources
 FNA Editorial Committee. 1993-. Flora of North America. URL: http://floranorthamerica.org/Main_Page
 Hickman, J. C., ed. 1993. The Jepson manual: higher plants of California
 Mathew, B. 1981. The Iris. 98.

External links
Calflora Database:  Iris munzii (Munz's iris)
Jepson Manual eFlora (TJM2) treatment of Iris munzii
USDA Plants Profile for Iris munzii (Munz's iris)
Flora of North America
UC Photos gallery — Iris munzii

munzii
Endemic flora of California
Flora of the Sierra Nevada (United States)
Natural history of Tulare County, California
Plants described in 1938